NWU Astro, known as the NWU-PUK Astro , is a field hockey stadium in North-West University, Potchefstroom, North West, South Africa.

In the past, the stadium has hosted the following major tournaments:
 2022 Women's FIH Hockey Junior World Cup
 Varsity Hockey in 2013, 2015, 2019
2021–22 Men's FIH Pro League
2022 Men's FIH Hockey Nations Cup

References

Field hockey venues in South Africa
Sports venues in North West (South African province)